Bois Blanc may refer to:

 One of two islands in the Great Lakes:
Bois Blanc Island (Michigan) 
Bois Blanc Island (Ontario)
Bois Blanc Township, Michigan, United States
Bois Blanc Pines School District
Bois Blanc Light, on the island in Michigan
Bois Blanc Island Lighthouse and Blockhouse, National Historic Site of Canada, on the island in Ontario